Oswaldo Lopez is a long-distance runner, specializing in Ultramarathons. He is most well known for winning the Badwater Ultramarathon in 2011. He has also won the Iron Horse 100 Miler, the Yellowstone-Teton 100 Miler, the Tahoe Midnight Express Ultra 72 Miler, and other races. Lopez lives in Madera, California.

References

American male ultramarathon runners
Living people
Year of birth missing (living people)
Sportspeople from California
People from Madera, California